Lieutenant-Colonel John Simon Frederick Fraser (1765–1803), also referred to as Simon Fraser, the younger of Lovat, commanded the Fraser Fencibles in Ireland and was Member of Parliament (M.P.) for Inverness-shire from 1796 to 1802.

Biography
Simon Fraser was the eldest son of Archibald Fraser 20th MacShimidh (1736–1815) and Jane, daughter of William Fraser. He matriculated at Wadham College, Oxford on 4 July 1786 and entered Lincoln's Inn in 1789 and the Inner Temple in 1793.

He was Lieutenant-Colonel of the Fraser Fencibles, and saw service in Ireland during the Irish rebellion of 1798.  This regiment was raised in 1794 by James Fraser of Balladrum (who had served in the 78th Fraser Highlanders under Lieutenant-General Simon Fraser). It disbanded in 1802.

Fraser was a Member of Parliament for Inverness-shire from 1796 to 1802, and died before his father, unmarried, in Lisbon on 6 April 1803. He had an illegitimate son.

Notes

References

Further reading

1765 births
1803 deaths
John Simon Frederick
Members of Lincoln's Inn
Alumni of Wadham College, Oxford
Members of the Inner Temple
Scottish military personnel
Members of the Parliament of Great Britain for Scottish constituencies
British MPs 1796–1800
Members of the Parliament of the United Kingdom for Scottish constituencies
UK MPs 1801–1802